Parliamentary elections were held in Haiti on 12 May 1946. They followed the overthrow of President Élie Lescot's government by Paul Magloire on 11 January.

Campaign
Over 200 candidates contested the 37 seats in the Chamber of Deputies and 21 seats in the Senate. The elections were the first in Haiti to have a significant number of left-wing candidates, and the Haitian Communist Party staged a large demonstration in Port-au-Prince on 1 May.

Conduct
Left-wing candidates claimed that the Ministry of the Interior, headed by coup leader Magloire, had rigged the results. This view was supported by the American embassy after the discovery of the mass sale of electoral cards in the week preceding the elections.

Aftermath
An outbreak of violence two days after the elections left five people dead. Dumarsais Estimé was elected president by the legislature on 16 August, defeating Communist Party leader Félix d'Orléans Juste Constant and Démosthènes Pétrus Calixte (the candidate of a coalition including the Worker Peasant Movement) in a second round of voting.

References

Haiti
1946 in Haiti
Elections in Haiti
Election and referendum articles with incomplete results